Ceratophora karu, also known as Karu's horned lizard or Karu's horn lizard, is a species of lizard in the family  Agamidae. The species is endemic to Sri Lanka.

Etymology
The specific name, karu, is in honor of Sri Lankan zoologist G. Punchi Banda "Karu" Karunaratne (1930–1996).

Geographic range and habitat

Description
The head of C. karu is oval, and is longer than wide. The rostral appendage comprises more scales than rostral scales. The scales are triangular, smooth or weakly keeled. The length of the rostral appendage is less than eye-nostril distance. There are prominent superciliary scales. There is a backward-pointing V-shaped ridge at the back of the forehead. The dorsal scales are larger than the scales on the flanks. The lamellae under the fourth toe number 14–17.

The dorsum is dark black-brown, and the flanks are brown or olive-green. Some specimens have bright orange-red patches on the supralabials. The throat and venter are buff or dirty white to yellowish-brown with small black patches.

Reproduction
C. karu is oviparous. About 2 eggs are produced at a time, measuring 8.6 mm x 5.0 mm.

References

Further reading
Pethiyagoda R, Manamendra-Arachchi K (1998). "A revision of the endemic Sri Lankan agamid lizard genus Ceratophora Gray, 1835, with description of two new species". J. South Asian Nat. Hist. 3 (1): 1-50. (Ceratophora karu, new species).

External links
http://www.wildreach.com/reptile/Sauria/Ceratophora%20karu.php

karu
Lizards of Asia
Reptiles of Sri Lanka
Endemic fauna of Sri Lanka
Reptiles described in 1998
Taxa named by Rohan Pethiyagoda